Khowr (also Romanized as Khūr and Khur; also known as Kharū) is a village in Kuhpayeh Rural District Rural District, in the Central District of Bardaskan County, Razavi Khorasan Province, Iran. At the 2006 census, its population was 679, in 207 families.

References 

Populated places in Bardaskan County